National Route 428 is a national highway of Japan connecting Chūō-ku, Kobe and Miki, Hyōgo in Japan, with a total length of 34.4 km (21.38 mi).

References

National highways in Japan
Roads in Hyōgo Prefecture